Vi var där blixten hittade ner – Bränt krut vol. 3 is a live album by Lars Winnerbäck released in 2008, containing songs recorded live during 2007. Although the album was only available at Winnerbäck concerts during 2008, it reached the number one spot on the Swedish Album Chart.

Track listing
Farväl Jupiter 
Jag har väntat på ett regn 
Stockholms Kyss 
Om du lämnade mig nu 
En tätort på en slätt 
Och det blåser genom hallen 
Elegi 
Hugger i sten 
Kom ihåg mig 
Ingen soldat 
Elden

Charts

Weekly charts

Year-end charts 

Lars Winnerbäck albums
2008 live albums

References